The 1954–55 season was the 44th season in Hajduk Split’s history and their 9th in the Yugoslav First League. Their 4th place finish in the 1953–54 season meant it was their 9th successive season playing in the Yugoslav First League.

Competitions

Overall

Yugoslav First League

Classification

Matches

Yugoslav First League

Sources: hajduk.hr

Yugoslav Cup

Sources: hajduk.hr

Player seasonal records

Top scorers

Source: Competitive matches

See also
1954–55 Yugoslav First League
1954 Yugoslav Cup

External sources
 1954–55 Yugoslav Cup at rsssf.com

HNK Hajduk Split seasons
Hajduk Split
Yugoslav football championship-winning seasons